The Lithuanian Ice Hockey Federation, also known as Hockey Lietuva (LLRF), is the governing body that oversees ice hockey in Lithuania. Lithuania had first joined the International Ice Hockey Federation on February 19, 1938, but was annexed by the Soviet Union in 1940. The nation re-joined the IIHF on May 6, 1992, along with Estonia and Latvia.

See also 

 Lithuania men's national ice hockey team
 Lithuania women's national ice hockey team

References

External links
 
Lithuania at IIHF.com

Federation
Ice hockey governing bodies in Europe
International Ice Hockey Federation members
Ice hockey
Sports organizations established in 1938
1938 establishments in Lithuania